Jack Knight may refer to:

Jack Knight (aviator), delivered first overnight transcontinental airmail
Jack Knight (baseball) (1895–1976), American right-handed pitcher in Major League Baseball
Jack Knight (engineer), gear cutter, transmission designer
Jack Knight (footballer) (1912–1976), Australian rules footballer
Jack Knight (political scientist) (born 1952), American political scientist
Jack Knight (songwriter), American songwriter and producer
Jack Knight (unionist) (1902–1981), American labor union leader
Jack L. Knight (1917–1945), American soldier
Starman (Jack Knight), comic book character

See also
John Knight (disambiguation)